Nina Makino-Hillman (born February 27, 2005), also known professionally as ,  , and monomously as , is an American singer and former child actress based in Japan. She is a member of the Japanese girl group NiziU.

Makino began her career as a child actress, appearing in several acting and campaign projects. After passing the first Amuse Multilingual Artists Audition held by Amuse Inc., Makino relocated to Japan and appeared in the film Blood Friends (2019). She left the company to participate in JYP Entertainment's survival reality program Nizi Project, where she, after finishing in ninth place, became a member of NiziU.

Early life 
Makino was born on February 27, 2005, in Seattle, Washington, United States. She was born to a Japanese mother and an American father. She has an older sister. After moving to Japan in 2017, Makino lived in Nagoya. Makino is fluent in English and Japanese.

Career

Pre-debut 
While at ACT (A Contemporary Theatre), Makino starred as Trixie in Cat on a Hot Tin Roof (2015). Makino was the understudy for the musical theatre performance The Secret Garden for the role of Mary Lennox. She portrayed the young Beatrice Chance in the Book-It Repertory Theatre's production of The Brothers K, Part One: Strike Zone. Makino was also a featured actress in the online video campaign "How Girls Will Change the World", which promoted STEM education for girls. Her first acting role outside of theater was the American web series Divine Shadow (2016), an independent production filmed in Burien, Washington.

2017–2019: Early Japanese projects 

In 2017, Makino was one of six female finalists out of 4,000 applicants who passed the first Amuse Multilingual Artists Audition held by Amuse Inc. She signed with the company and moved to Japan. Her audition was partially broadcast on the television program Why Did You Come to Japan? in a segment focusing on the audition finals. Makino was cast in Mamoru Oshii's film Blood Friends, which was filmed in 2018. In 2019, she became a regular on NHK Educational TV show Suiensā as a member of the Suiensā Girls.

2020–present: Nizi Project and NiziU 

In 2019, Makino left Amuse to audition for JYP Entertainment's reality survival program Nizi Project (2020) under the name Nina Hillman, where she competed to secure a spot in the label's next girl group. Out of 10,231 applicants, Makino came in ninth place, and she went on to join the new girl group, which was later named NiziU. The group debuted on December 2, 2020, with their lead single, "Step and a Step". With the public release of Blood Friends in 2022 after years of postponement, several Japanese media outlets have discussed that media promotions for the film were not allowed to mention that Makino is a member of NiziU due to troubles negotiating with JYP Entertainment, who had distanced her from her previous acting career.

Filmography

Film

Web series

Television

Notes

References 

2005 births
Living people
21st-century American women singers
21st-century American singers
21st-century Japanese actresses
American actresses of Japanese descent
American emigrants to Japan
Japanese expatriates in South Korea
Japanese K-pop singers
Japanese people of American descent
Japanese-language singers
Japanese female idols
JYP Entertainment artists
Korean-language singers of Japan
Musicians from Seattle
People from Washington (state)